Crackerjack (released in the Philippines as Agent of Destruction) is a 1994 action film directed by Michael Mazo and starring Thomas Ian Griffith, Nastassja Kinski and Christopher Plummer.

Plot
Jack Wild (Thomas Ian Griffith) is a Chicago police officer dealing with post traumatic stress disorder after the murder of his wife and two children during an investigation into organized crime. Nicknamed "Crackerjack" by his colleagues due to his reckless behavior, Jack is forced into a family vacation with his older brother, Michael, and sister-in-law, Annie, at an isolated Rocky Mountains resort. Meanwhile, a kidnapped ice scientist has been forced to plant bombs in the surrounding glacier in a mysterious plot organized by the terrorist Ivan Getz (Christopher Plummer).

Arriving at the resort via cable car, Jack meets the activities coordinator KC (Nastassja Kinski) whom he dances with that evening at dinner. While dancing, however, Jack recognizes the mob boss he was investigating when his family was murdered and, after causing a scene, leaves in a huff. At that moment, the terrorists take control of the resort and attempt to coerce the mob boss to hand over his cache of diamonds, but he refuses, and subsequently dies without revealing their location. Meanwhile, Jack has become a thorn in Getz’s side as he slowly picks off his men and searches for the diamonds himself to use as a bargaining chip. Jack signals for help from a nearby military base, but Getz shoots down the rescue helicopter, and sets up a bomb to destroy any rescue via cable car. While trying to warn a group of soldiers attempting a cable car rescue Jack is shot (as the soldiers believe he is a terrorist) and the cable car explodes, eliminating all hope of an immediate rescue.

An injured Jack, realizing that Getz is the man who murdered his family, limps to the resort first aid station where he discovers the ice scientist hiding from the terrorists. The ice scientist reveals the imminent destruction of the hotel by avalanche, which makes Jack realize that the diamonds are hidden in the ice in the mob boss’ hotel room. When Jack arrives at the suite, Getz discovers him and the diamonds which he takes. As he explains, the diamonds are to be used to pay for and train a small army to take over the world and to rule it as the leader of a superior race. He then shoots Michael (who survives thanks to Jack’s hip flask which he took earlier in the film), and attempts to escape via helicopter. But Jack destroys the helicopter, and, along with all of the hotel guests, escapes to a nearby cave just as the glacier explodes destroying the hotel and killing Getz. KC, now out of a job, promises to visit Jack in Chicago.

Production
The film began shooting in Vancouver, British Columbia on September 13 and completed shooting on October 23, 1993. The film was released in United States on video March 21, 1995.

Release
Crackerjack was released in the Philippines as Agent of Destruction by Solar Films on July 29, 1994.

Worldvision Enterprises, a division of Spelling Entertainment, acquired all U.S. rights to Crackerjack from North American Releasing.

Reception
The film received three stars from the DVD & Video Guide 2005 which states that the movie "would have been even better if star Thomas Ian Griffith were a better actor".

DVD release
Republic Pictures has yet to announce any plans to release the film onto DVD.

Sequels
The film spawned two sequels, Crackerjack 2 (released in the US as Hostage Train) with Judge Reinhold taking over the role of Jack Wild, and Crackerjack 3 which does not connect to the first two and focuses on Jack Thorn played by Bo Svenson.

References

External links
 
 

1994 films
1990s action films
1990s action adventure films
1990s heist films
American action adventure films
American action films
English-language Canadian films
Canadian heist films
Films about hostage takings
Canadian action films
1990s English-language films
1990s American films
1990s Canadian films